The College of Engineering, Kallooppara (CEKPR, CEK), is an engineering college located in Kallooppara in the Pathanamthitta District of  Kerala. It was established by the Institute of Human Resources Development in 1999. The college is affiliated to the APJ Abdul Kalam Technological University and approved by All India Council for Technical Education.

Hostel
There is a college hostel for girls near to the college, and a hostel for men.

Courses
Undergraduate Courses

The college offers undergraduate B.Tech programs and a postgraduate M.Tech program.
B.Tech in Computer Science and Engineering (CSE)
B.Tech in Computer Science and Engineering - Cyber Security
B.Tech in Electronics and Communication Engineering
B.Tech in Electrical and Electronics Engineering

Postgraduate Courses
M.Tech in Cyber Forensics and Information Security

Location
CEKPR is situated in the hills of Pathanamthitta district Kallooppara. The Thiruvalla railway station and bus station are 8 km from the college.

Gallery

References

External links
Official website
Cochin University of Science And Technology website
The Institute of Human Resource Development Kerala website

Engineering colleges in Kerala
All India Council for Technical Education
Institute of Human Resources Development
Universities and colleges in Pathanamthitta district